Léon Gaultier (1 February 1915—18 July 1997) was a French collaborator and a founding member of the Front National.

Biography 
Léon was born on 1 February 1915 in Bourges. He studied classics and became a professor of history.

During World War II, he worked along with Paul Marion, General Secretary for Information in the government of Philippe Pétain. Gaultier was a columnist for Radio-Vichy and one of the founders of the Milice.

Gaultier fought for Germany in the Waffen-SS with the rank of Untersturmführer. He commanded a French unit on the Eastern Front in the fall of 1944 and was seriously wounded in Galicia. He was sentenced to forced labor in 1946 and released on 2 June 1948, he eventually worked for the advertising agency Havas.

During the presidential campaign of far-right candidate Jean-Louis Tixier-Vignancour in 1965, Gaultier was responsible for propagand and worked alongside former Cagoulard turned resistance fighter Serge Jeanneret.

He later co-founded with Jean-Marie Le Pen, the publishing house SERP ("Société d'études et de relations publiques") which specialized in editing historical recordings, like political speeches or military songs.

In 1972, he was among the founders of the National Council of the National Front. Gaultier wrote in Rivarol and was gradually moved away from the circle of Jean-Marie Le Pen in early 1980s. Thereafter, he concentrated on writing his memoir.

Works 
 .
 .

Notes 

French Waffen-SS personnel
French military personnel of World War II
Politicians from Bourges
National Rally (France) politicians
1915 births
1997 deaths
SS-Untersturmführer